The Hollywood Actress Award is a category of the Hollywood Film Awards held annually since 1999.

History

Superlatives

External links
 

Awards established in 1999
Awards for actresses
Actress Award
1999 establishments in California